Nupserha flavonotum is a species of beetle in the family Cerambycidae. It was described by Per Olof Christopher Aurivillius in 1915.

Subspecies
 Nupserha flavonotum occidentalis Breuning, 1961
 Nupserha flavonotum flavonotum (Aurivillius, 1915)

References

flavonotum
Beetles described in 1915